Mouna Ayoub (born 27 February 1957 in Kuwait) is a French socialite and businesswoman of Lebanese origin. Frequently in the media, she is often a guest of the Cannes film festival and makes headlines in French gossip magazines.

Biography
She was born into a Maronite Christian family. At the age of 20 she converted to Islam to marry Nasser Al-Rashid, a 40-year-old businessman and adviser to King Fahd. She has five children with Nasser Al-Rashid. After eighteen years of marriage, and according to her divorce agreements, she left Saudi Arabia and built a fortune by investing in real estate and stocks. She wrote about her marriage in her 2000 book La Vérité: autobiographie.

Ayoub stated she wrote the book to explain her situation, and to address allegations published by a Lebanese magazine that she was a modern-day Madame Bovary. As Scott MacLeod of Time wrote: "But if her tale provides a rare look at the extravagance often wrought by unimagined wealth, it also serves as a disturbing manifesto against the extreme restrictions imposed on women by some ultraconservative Arab societies." Her former husband filed suit in an attempt to stop publication of the autobiography.   The book became a best seller in France.

In 1997, she bought a boat from Bernard Tapie, the Phocéa (the largest sailing yacht in the world before 2004), for €5.56 million to which was added €18.25 million worth of work. To pay for the work she sold a number of her jewels including "The Mouna diamond", one of the largest yellow diamonds of the world for a price of €2.52 million (16.5 million francs) a Bulgari necklace for 15.3 million francs, and a collection of jewels by 
Tabbah. After getting rid of the yacht, she sold the contents in a well publicized auction.

The Associated Press estimated her net worth at over $300 million. In 2006, The New York Times offered a figure of about $500 million.

She has the largest private collection of haute couture in the world, encompassing more than 10,000 items. She never wears the same item of couture twice, and all of the major couture houses maintain an Ayoub mannequin for a proper fit in her absence. The Associated Press claimed: "She's also a couture philanthropist. She has just do  world will this week disclose how a disastrous marriage to a Saudi Royal family adviser drove her to depression and attempted suicide."

Published works

References

External links

1957 births
Living people
Naturalized citizens of France
Converts to Islam
Lebanese Sunni Muslims
French Muslims
French former Christians
Lebanese socialites
Lebanese businesspeople
Former Maronite Christians
Lebanese women in business
Lebanese emigrants to France
Lebanese emigrants to Saudi Arabia
Lebanese emigrants to Kuwait